The 29th Air Division (29th AD) is an inactive United States Air Force organization.  Its last assignment was with Air Defense Command, being stationed at Duluth International Airport, Minnesota.  It was inactivated on 15 November 1969.

History

Assigned to Air Defense Command (ADC) for most of its existence, the division's mission was the air defense of Montana, Idaho, Wyoming, and parts of Nevada, Utah, and Colorado. By 1953, the area changed to include North Dakota, South Dakota, and Nebraska. The 29th supervised the training of its units, and participated in numerous training exercises.

The division moved from Richards-Gebaur Air Force Base, Missouri, to Duluth International Airport, Minnesota, on 1 April 1966 as part of an ADC reorganization, the division's area changed to include Minnesota, parts of Wisconsin, and North Dakota, and later expanded to cover most of Iowa. Assumed additional designation of 29th NORAD Region after activation of the NORAD Combat Operations Center at the Cheyenne Mountain Complex, Colorado and reporting was transferred to NORAD from ADC at Ent Air Force Base in April 1966 as the : Organized as 29th NORAD Region/Air Division on 1 April 1966, replacing the Duluth Air Defense Sector.

Inactivated in November 1969 as ADC phased down its interceptor mission as the chances of a Soviet bomber attack on the United States seemed remote, its mission being consolidated into North American Aerospace Defense Command (NORAD)'s, 23d and 24th NORAD Regions/Air Divisions.

Lineage
 Established as the 29 Air Division (Defense) on 29 January 1951
 Activated on 1 March 1951
 Inactivated on 1 February 1952
 Organized on 1 February 1952
 Redesignated 29 Air Division (SAGE) on 1 January 1960
 Inactivated on 19 November 1969

Assignments
 Western Air Defense Force, 1 March 1951
 Central Air Defense Force, 16 February 1953
 Air Defense Command, 1 January 1960
 Tenth Air Force, 1 April 1966
 First Air Force, 15 September – 19 November 1969

Stations
 Great Falls Air Force Base, Montana, 1 March 1951 – 1 February 1952
 Richards-Gebaur Air Force Base, Missouri, 1 July 1961
 Duluth International Airport, Minnesota, 1 April 1966 – 19 November 1969

Components

Sectors

 Grand Forks Air Defense Sector: 1 January 1959 – 1 December 1963
 Grand Forks Air Force Base, North Dakota
 Great Falls Air Defense Sector: 1 March 1959 – 1 April 1966
 Malmstrom Air Force Base, Montana
 Kansas City Air Defense Sector (Manual): 1 July 1961 – 1 January 1962
 Richards-Gebaur Air Force Base, Missouri

 Minot Air Defense Sector: 1 April 1959 – 15 August 1963
 Minot Air Force Base, North Dakota
 Oklahoma City Air Defense Sector (Manual): 25 June 1963 – 1 April 1966
 Richards-Gebaur Air Force Base, Missouri
 Sioux City Air Defense Sector: 1 July 1961 – 1 April 1966
 Sioux City Municipal Airport, Iowa

Wing
 507th Fighter Wing (Air Defense): 1 April 1966 – 30 September 1968
 Kincheloe Air Force Base, Michigan

Groups

 32d Fighter Group: 8 February 1957 – 1 August 1960
 Minot Air Force Base, North Dakota
 343d Fighter Group: 1 April 1966 – 15 September 1969; 14–19 November 1969
 Duluth MAP, Minnesota
 476th Fighter Group: 8 February 1957 – 1 April 1960
 [[Glasgow Air Force Base, Montana

 478th Fighter Group: 1 January – 1 July 1959
 Grand Forks Air Force Base, North Dakota
 545th Aircraft Control and Warning Group
 Great Falls Air Force Base, Montana, 1 March 1951 – 6 February 1952

Interceptor squadrons

 13th Fighter-Interceptor Squadron: 1 April 1960 – 1 January 1961
 Glasgow Air Force Base, Montana
 18th Fighter-Interceptor Squadron: 1 April 1966 – 15 September 1969
 Grand Forks Air Force Base, North Dakota
 29th Fighter-Interceptor Squadron: 8 November 1953 – 1 July 1960
 Malmstrom Air Force Base, Montana

 54th Fighter-Interceptor Squadron: 16 February 1953 – 25 December 1960
 Ellsworth Air Force Base, South Dakota
 62d Fighter-Interceptor Squadron: 1 April 1966 – 15 September 1969
 K.I. Sawyer Air Force Base, Michigan

Missile squadrons
 37th Air Defense Missile Squadron (BOMARC)
 Kincheloe Air Force Base, Michigan, 1 April 1966 – 19 November 1969
 74th Air Defense Missile Squadron (BOMARC)
 Duluth AF Missile Site, Minnesota, 1 April 1966 – 19 November 1969

Radar squadrons

 661st Radar Squadron
 Selfridge Air Force Base, Michigan, 14–19 November 1969
 665th Radar Squadron
 Calumet Air Force Station, Michigan, 1 April 1966 – 19 November 1969
 674th Radar Squadron
 Osceola Air Force Station, Wisconsin, 1 April 1966 – 15 November 1969; 14–19 November 1969
 676th Radar Squadron
 Antigo Air Force Station, Wisconsin, 14 November 1969 – 30 June 1977
 680th Aircraft Control and Warning Squadron
 Yaak Air Force Station, Montana, 6 February 1952 – 16 February 1953
 681st Aircraft Control and Warning Squadron
 Cut Bank Air Force Station, Montana, 6 February 1952 – 1 July 1960
 692d Radar Squadron
 Baudette Air Force Station, Minnesota, 1 April 1966 – 19 November 1969
 694th Aircraft Control and Warning Squadron
 Lewistown Air Force Station, Montana, 1 September 1958 – 1 July 1960
 706th Aircraft Control and Warning Squadron
 Dickinson Air Force Station, North Dakota, 1 July 1958 – 1 January 1961
 716th Aircraft Control and Warning Squadron
 Kalispell Air Force Station, Montana, 15 February – 1 July 1960
 721st Aircraft Control and Warning Squadron
 Willmar Air Force Station, Minnesota, 1 January – 1 April 1959
 731st Radar Squadron
 Sundance Air Force Station, Wyoming, 1 December 1960 – 1 January 1961
 739th Radar Squadron
 Wadena Air Force Station, Minnesota, 14–19 November 1969
 740th Aircraft Control and Warning Squadron
 Ellsworth Air Force Base, South Dakota, 16 February 1953 – 1 January 1961
 752d Radar Squadron
 Empire Air Force Station, Michigan, 14 November 1966 – 19 November 1969

 753d Radar Squadron
 Sault Sainte Marie Air Force Station, Michigan, 14–19 November 1969
 754th Radar Squadron
 Port Austin Air Force Station, Michigan, 14–19 November 1969
 756th Radar Squadron]]
 Finland Air Force Station, Minnesota, 1 April 1966 – 15 September 1969
 778th Aircraft Control and Warning Squadron
 Havre Air Force Station, Montana, 6 February 1952 – 1 July 1960
 779th Aircraft Control and Warning Squadron
 Opheim Air Force Station, Montana, 6 February 1952 – 1 January 1961
 780th Aircraft Control and Warning Squadron
 Fortuna Air Force Station, North Dakota, 6 February 1952 – 1 January 1961
 785th Radar Squadron
 Finley Air Force Station, North Dakota, 20 May 1953 – 1 March 1956; 1 January 1959 – 1 April 1969
 786th Aircraft Control and Warning Squadron
 Minot Air Force Station, North Dakota, 16 February 1953 – 1 January 1961
 787th Radar Squadron
 Chandler Air Force Station, Minnesota, 1 July 1968 – 30 September 1969
 788th Radar Squadron
 Waverly Air Force Station, Iowa, 1 July 1968 – 30 September 1969
 801st Aircraft Control and Warning Squadron
 Malmstrom Air Force Base, Montana, 1 February 1956 – 1 July 1960
 902d Aircraft Control and Warning Squadron
 Miles City Air Force Station, Montana, 20 May 1953 – 1 January 1961
 903d Aircraft Control and Warning Squadron
 Gettysburg Air Force Station, South Dakota, 20 May 1953 – 1 March 1956; 1 January 1959 – 1 April 1969
 908th Aircraft Control and Warning Squadron
 Great Falls Air Force Base, Montana, 25 June 1953 – 25 September 1954
 916th Aircraft Control and Warning Squadron
 Beausejour Air Station, Manitoba, 1 January – 1 April 1959

Radar evaluation squadron
 4677th Radar Evaluation Squadron
 Hill Air Force Base, Utah, 1 January 1960 – 1 July 1961

See also
 List of United States Air Force Aerospace Defense Command Interceptor Squadrons
 List of United States Air Force air divisions
 United States general surveillance radar stations

References

Notes

Bibliography

 
 
 

Aerospace Defense Command units
029
1951 establishments in Montana
1969 disestablishments in Minnesota